Te Tai Rāwhiti Māori are a group of Māori iwi at or around the east coast Gisborne District of the North Island of New Zealand. It includes the iwi (tribe) of Ngāti Porou and its hapū (sub-tribe) of Te Aitanga-a-Hauiti. It also includes the iwi of Ngāriki Kaiputahi, Te Aitanga ā Māhaki, Rongowhakaata and Ngāi Tāmanuhiri.

References